Alid revolt can refer to any rebellion by Alid partisans against the Umayyad and Abbasid caliphates:

 Alid revolts during the Second Fitna, against the Umayyads, suppressed in the Battle of 'Ayn al-Warda and the Battle of Harura
 Zaydi revolt of 740 in Kufa, against the Umayyads
 Alid revolt of 762–763 in Medina and Basra, against the Abbasids
 Alid revolt of 786 in Mecca, against the Abbasids, suppressed in the Battle of Fakhkh

See also
 Alid dynasties of northern Iran